Dennis Banks (April 12, 1937, in Ojibwe – October 29, 2017) was a Native American activist, teacher, and author. He was a longtime leader of the American Indian Movement, which he co-founded in Minneapolis, Minnesota in 1968 to represent urban Indians.

Early life 
Born on Leech Lake Indian Reservation in northern Minnesota in 1937, Dennis Banks was also known as Nowa Cumig (Naawakamig in the Ojibwe Double Vowel System).

Banks's mother abandoned him to be raised by grandparents. But, he was separated from that family, too, when he was taken at the age of 5 to live at a federal Indian boarding school, run by the Bureau of Indian Affairs (now the Bureau of Indian Education). Its goals were to "civilize" and educate Native American children in English and mainstream culture, in effect, to assimilate them. Children were prohibited to speak their native languages or practice their traditions. Vocational training was emphasized. Banks ran away often, returning to live with family at Leech Lake. He attended Pipestone Indian Boarding School in Minnesota, which closed in 1953. It had been founded in 1892 according to the federal model established at the Carlisle Indian Industrial School.

When he was 17, Banks joined the US Air Force and was stationed in Japan. He was fascinated to be in a place where Europeans were the minority. During this period, in 1956 he was ordered to shoot to kill anti-base protesters during the Sunagawa Struggle. The events had a profound influence on him.

Dishonorable discharge and return to Minnesota
He married and had his first child. After he went AWOL, he was dishonorably discharged from the military. He returned to Minnesota, where he participated in a burglary, for which he was convicted, serving two and a half years in prison.

Activism

Work with AIM 
In 1968, Banks co-founded the American Indian Movement (AIM) in Minneapolis.<ref name="STO">{{cite news|url=http://www.startribune.com/obituary-longtime-american-india'n-activist-dennis-banks/454089543/|title=American Indian Movement founder Dennis Banks dies at 80|newspaper=Star Tribune|access-date=October 30, 2017|date=October 30, 2017}}</ref> They were seeking to ensure and protect the civil rights of Native Americans living in urban areas.

Banks participated in the 1969–1971 occupation of Alcatraz Island, initiated by Indian students from San Francisco of the Red Power movement. It was intended to highlight Native American issues and promote Indian sovereignty on their own lands.

 Trail of Broken Treaties 
In 1972, he assisted in the organization of AIM's "Trail of Broken Treaties", a caravan of numerous activist groups across the United States to Washington, D.C. to call attention to the plight of Native Americans. The caravan members anticipated meeting with United States Congress leaders about related issues, but government officials, most notably Harrison Loesch, the Interior Department Assistant Secretary responsible for the Bureau of Indian Affairs (BIA), refused to meet with delegates. Banks helped lead a takeover of the BIA offices. Activists seized and occupied the headquarters of the Department of Interior.; in the process some vandalized the offices of the BIA. Many valuable Indian land deeds were destroyed or lost during the occupation. Over 9000 tons of documents were removed by AIM members and hidden by the Hatteras Tuscarora and Lumbee in  Robeson County, N.C.  The FBI would find the documents and many were returned to the BIA.

Some thirty years later, Banks returned to Robeson County, N.C. where he reconnected with  Hatteras Tuscarora/Lumbee Attorney and Activist JoJo Brooks Shifflett.  Banks and Shifflett remained in a committed relationship during the last years of his life.

 Wounded Knee incident 
In 1973 Banks went to Pine Ridge Indian Reservation in South Dakota when the local Lakota civil rights organization asked for help in dealing with law enforcement authorities in nearby border towns. Residents of Pine Ridge believed the police had failed to prosecute the murder of a young Lakota man. Under Banks' leadership, AIM led a protest in Custer, South Dakota in 1973 against judicial proceedings that had resulted in the reduction of charges of a white man to a second degree offense for murdering a Native American.

AIM became involved in the political faction wanting to oust Richard Wilson, the elected chairman of the Oglala Sioux Tribe. Opponents believed that he was acting autocratically, including recruiting a private police force. A failure of an impeachment proceeding against him led to a large protest. Banks and other AIM activists occupied Wounded Knee. After a siege of 71 days by federal armed law enforcement, which received national attention, the occupation was ended. A U.S. marshal was shot and paralyzed in March. A Cherokee and an Oglala Lakota were fatally shot in April 1973 by federal agents. Civil rights activist Ray Robinson, who had joined the protesters, disappeared during the occupation and is believed to have been murdered.

Thirty resident families returned to the village to find that their homes and businesses had been  destroyed by the federal agents. The town was never rebuilt. Banks was the principal negotiator and leader of the Wounded Knee occupation. Subsequent investigation of Wilson found questionable accounting practices, and Wilson had sold off tens of thousands of acres of the reservation to mining companies. As a result of involvement in Custer and Wounded Knee, Banks and 300 others were arrested by the federal government and faced trial. He was acquitted of the Wounded Knee charges, but was convicted of incitement to riot and assault stemming from the earlier confrontation at Custer.

Aquash murder and trial

Refusing the prison term, Banks jumped bail and worked with Anna Mae Pictou Aquash in the American Indian Movement. After the Wounded Knee Occupation''' —where COINTELPRO FBI agents sieged the occupation, cut off electricity, water and food supplies to Wounded Knee, when it was still winter in South Dakota, and prohibited the entry of the media; and the US government tried starving out the occupants, AIM activists smuggled food and medical supplies in past roadblocks "set up by Dick Wilson and tacitly supported by the US government"—  there were many suspicious events surrounding murders of AIM activists and their subsequent investigations or lack thereof. Deaths of AIM activists went uninvestigated, even though there was an abundance of FBI agents on Pine Ridge Indian Reservation at the time. For instance, Annie Mae Aquash was an activist who had been present at Wounded Knee and was framed by the FBI as a spy for the government. It was later revealed that most of this campaign to discredit her can be traced to Douglass Durham, an FBI informant. Aquash was found dead near Highway 73 on February 24, 1976. FBI ruled her cause of death was exposure, suggesting alcohol had been involved, even though there was none in her bloodstream. Dissatisfied with this finding, an exhumation was requested by OSCRO, which found that Aquash had been shot in the back of her head at close range, after being beaten severely in the face with many of her teeth missing from the beating. After disappearing from Denver in late 1975, Aquash was found murdered in February 1976 by a rancher near the Pine Ridge Reservation. She had been shot in the back of the head execution style, and her murder was unsolved for decades.

Banks was given amnesty in California by then-Governor Jerry Brown, who refused to extradite him to South Dakota to face the charges related to activities in the 1973 Custer protests. He also received financial support from actor and AIM sympathizer Marlon Brando.

In January 2003, a federal grand jury indicted Arlo Looking Cloud and John Graham in the murder of Aquash. Since 2004, they have been convicted by federal and state juries; each is serving a life sentence.

In 2008, Vine Richard "Dick" Marshall was indicted by a federal grand jury for aiding and abetting the murder of Aquash; he was alleged to have provided John Graham with a gun. He was acquitted of the charge. In 1975, he had been serving as one of Banks' bodyguards. Aquash was brought to Marshall's house on the Pine Ridge Reservation in December 1975 before being taken to the site of her murder. Authorities continue to investigate the Aquash murder. In 2014, The New York Times Magazine spoke to Banks for an in-depth feature about the murders of Aquash and Robinson.

Education and career
During his time in California from 1976 to 1983, Banks earned an associate's degree from the University of California, Davis. He taught at the recently opened Native American Studies department at Contra Costa College and at Deganawidah Quetzalcoatl University (DQU), a Native American-controlled institute of alternative higher learning, where he became the first American Indian chancellor. In 1978, he established the first spiritual run from Davis to Los Angeles, which is now an annual event. In the spring of 1979, he taught at Stanford University.

After Governor Brown left office, in 1984 Banks received sanctuary from the Onondaga Nation in upstate New York. While on their reservation in New York, Banks organized the Great Jim Thorpe Longest Run from New York to Los Angeles; the goal was to gain restoration of the gold medals which Thorpe had won at the 1912 Olympics for the Thorpe family.

In 1985, Banks left Onondaga to surrender to federal law enforcement officials in South Dakota. He served 18 months in prison related to the 1973 charges for the Custer riot. After his release, he worked as a drug and alcohol counselor on the Pine Ridge Indian Reservation. During 1987, grave robbers in Uniontown, Kentucky were halted in their digging for artifacts in American Indian grave sites. Banks organized the reburial ceremonies. His activities resulted in the states of Kentucky and Indiana passing strict legislation against grave desecration.

In 2006, Banks led Sacred Run 2006, a spiritual run from San Francisco's Alcatraz Island to Washington, D.C.  The runners followed the ancient Native American tradition of bringing a message of "Land, Life and Peace" from village to village. They traveled around 100 miles every day and entered Washington, D.C. on Earth Day, April 22, 2006. Along the way, they took a southern route in solidarity with those who were rebuilding after hurricanes Katrina and Rita. Major events were held in Albuquerque, New Orleans, Philadelphia, Mississippi, a civil rights site; Knoxville, and Washington, D.C.

Since "The Longest Walk" in 1978, Sacred Runs have developed as an international movement. Sacred Run 2006 had runners from Japan, Australia, Ireland, and Canada, as well as many from the United States. In 2008, the International "The Longest Walk 2" followed the Sacred Run 2006 route, as well as the original route of 1978 walk. Dennis Banks delivered a "Manifesto for Change" to Representative John Conyers (D-MI).

Banks was a member of the board of trustees for Leech Lake Tribal College, a public, two-year college located just outside Cass Lake, Minnesota.

Politics
In August 2016, Banks received the vice presidential nomination of the Peace and Freedom Party, a socialist political party with ballot access in California.  He appeared on the California ballot with presidential nominee Gloria La Riva.

Other activities
Banks had roles in the movies War Party (1988), The Last of the Mohicans (1992), Thunderheart (1992), and Older Than America (2008).

The musical release Still Strong (1993) features Banks' original songs, as well as traditional Native American songs. He also participated as a musician on such albums as Peter Gabriel's Les Musiques du Monde and Peter Matthiessen's No Boundaries.

 Marriage and family 
Early in his life, Banks enlisted in the United States Air Force and was sent to Japan. While there, he married a woman named Machiko. After they had been together for two years, Machiko had a daughter, Michiko. Banks left Japan after being court martialed by the Air Force for being AWOL (Absent Without Official Leave). He never saw Machiko or Michiko again. He returned to Japan several times, but Machiko had remarried and Michiko was at university in Northern Japan.

According to birth records from Minnesota, Banks had seven children with wife Jeanette Banks: Janice (born March 2, 1962), Darla (born February 18, 1963), fraternal twins Deanna Jane and Dennis James (born April 20, 1964), Red Elk (born June 7, 1970), Tatanka Wanbli (born September 7, 1971), and Minoh Bekwad Banks (born October 10, 1992).

At Pine Ridge Reservation, Banks met Darlene Kamook Nichols, who was 17 and still in high school. He was 32. After she graduated, they started seeing each other and married. They had three daughters and a son together: Tokala, Tiopa, Tasina and son Tacanunpa Banks. They later divorced. (Kamook Nichols remarried and is now known as Darlene Ecoffey.)

In Salt Lake City he had a daughter, named Arrow, with Angie Begay (Navajo).

Banks has several stepchildren: Roland (Kawliga) Blanchard, Beverly Baribeau, Glenda Roberts, Denise Banks, Pearl Blanchard, and Danielle Louise Dickey. (Dickey was murdered in 2007 on the Turtle Mountain Reservation in North Dakota). He has a granddaughter named Migizi from Minneapolis, Minnesota.

Banks had 20 children and more than 100 grandchildren. Mr. Banks was in a committed relationship with Lumbee Attorney and Native Rights Activist, JoJo Brooks Shifflett in the later years  of his life  and at the time of his death.

Discography
In 2012, Banks joined forces with Golden Globe and Grammy Award-winning artist Kitaro in celebration of the Earth on the CD Let Mother Earth Speak. The project contains a message of international peace, intertwined with stories and life lessons from Banks, and featuring the music of Kitaro. The album was released on September 11, 2012, on Domo Records.

Death
Banks died at the age of 80 of complications from pneumonia following heart surgery on October 29, 2017, in Rochester, Minnesota.

Filmography
 War Party (1988) - Ben Crowkiller / Dead Crow Chief
 The Last of the Mohicans (1992) - Ongewasgone
 Thunderheart (1992) - Himself
 Older Than America (2008) - Pete Goodfeather (final film role)
 American Experience (2009, TV Series documentary - We Shall Remain: "Part V - Wounded Knee") - Himself
 A Good Day to Die (2010, Documentary) - Himself
 Nowa Cumig: The Drum Will Never Stop (2011, Documentary) - Himself
 California Indian (2011) - Himself

Autobiography
 Banks, Dennis and Richard Erdoes (2004). Ojibwa Warrior: Dennis Banks and the Rise of the American Indian Movement'', Norman, Oklahoma: University of Oklahoma Press.

References

External links
 Nowa Cumig Institute
 SacredRun, 2007
 Still Strong
 
 
 Dennis Banks Official Website
 Let Mother Earth Speak Facebook Page
 A Good Day to Die - film
 Nowa Cumig: The Drum Will Never Stop - film

20th-century Native Americans
Native American leaders
Native American activists
Members of the American Indian Movement
Military personnel from Minnesota
Writers from Minnesota
Native American musicians
Native American writers
Native American male actors
American male film actors
Male actors from Minnesota
Ojibwe people
University of California, Davis alumni
2016 United States vice-presidential candidates
Peace and Freedom Party vice presidential nominees
1937 births
2017 deaths
Native American candidates for Vice President of the United States
Domo Records artists